Benjamin Kantarovski (born 20 January 1992) is a former Australian professional soccer player who played for the Newcastle Jets as a midfielder. Ben is the older brother of former Newcastle Jets FC player Michael Kantarovski.

Club career

Newcastle Jets
Kantarovski was signed to a four-year contract by the Newcastle Jets in January 2008 while attending Lambton High School at only 15 years of age, making him the youngest player in A-League history to sign a full-time A-League contract, and one of the youngest players in world football to do so. He made his A-League debut in Round 1 of the 2008–09 season against the Central Coast Mariners playing as a defender. He was only 16 years and 208 days old making him at the time, the youngest player in A-League history. Kantarovski has since played in many different positions for the Newcastle Jets, including all positions across the defence, and all positions across the midfield, most commonly his preferred holding midfielder role. Kantarovski was named the Newcastle Jets Player of the Season in his debut year, despite only playing a handful of games.

Kantarovski has already attracted the interest of one of the powerhouses of German, European and world football, Bayern Munich. Kantarovski spent a week trialling with the Bundesliga club in April, 2009. At the conclusion of this trial, it appeared Bayern's interest in Kantarovski only grew, making it increasingly likely that Kantarovski would depart the A-League for Bayern once he reached the age of 18, FIFA's minimum age for a football player to play for a foreign club. After turning 18, Kantarovski opted to turn down an offer to join Bayern Munich's youth system. He did so after receiving the Kimon Taliadoros scholarship for his educational achievements.

On 12 November 2010, Kantarovski signed a 3-year contract extension keeping him at the Jets until the end of the 2013. He scored his first goal for the club with a header against Brisbane Roar in a 1–1 at EnergyAustralia Stadium on 17 November 2010.

Although contracted until June 2022, Kantarovski has not featured for the Jets in the A-league since the 2019/2020 season due to ongoing injury. During this extended injury period, Kantarovski has been studying a Bachelor of Psychology at Newcastle University.

International career
Kantarovski has represented Australia's under-17 team on 12 occasions, scoring 3 times. In 2009, he represented the under-20 team at the Under-20 World Cup as the youngest player in the squad, being a mere 17 years of age, starting in all of their group games, playing as a midfielder in the first game, before being shifted in to the heart of defence. Despite suffering from a knee injury that would eventually sideline him for 6 months, Kantarovski played for Young Socceroos throughout their World Cup campaign, and was a clear standout, named by many as the Socceroo's top player.

Kantarovski was called up by Socceroos coach Pim Verbeek into the Socceroos squad to play Kuwait in the AFC Asian Cup qualifying game against Kuwait, as well as inviting Ben to a training camp with the Socceroos squad.

Kantarovski was selected by Young Socceroos coach Jan Verslejen to captain the Young Socceroos despite being one of the youngest players in the squad. Verslejen cited Kantarovski's A-League and AFC Champions League experience, as well as being a member of the Young Socceroos Under-20 World Cup campaign as three big reasons for his appointment as captain. He also captained the Young Socceroos to victory in the 2010 Asean Football Federation Under-19 Championship, after their 1–0 win in the final against Thailand.

On 27 January 2012 he was selected to play for the Australia Olympic football team against Uzbekistan national under-23 football team and United Arab Emirates national under-23 football team. Kantarovski made his debut for the Australia Olympic football team in the London 2012 Olympic Qualifier against the United Arab Emirates at the Mohammed Bin Zayed Stadium on 22 February 2012.

Career statistics

1 - includes A-League final series statistics
2 - AFC Champions League statistics are included in season ending during group stages (i.e. ACL 2009 and A-League season 2008–09 etc.)

Honours

Country
Australia:
 AFF U-19 Youth Championship: 2010
 AFF U-16 Youth Championship: 2008

Individual
 Newcastle Jets Player of the Year: 2008-2009

References

External links
 Newcastle Jets profile

1992 births
Living people
Australian people of Macedonian descent
Australian soccer players
A-League Men players
Newcastle Jets FC players
Sportspeople from Newcastle, New South Wales
New South Wales Institute of Sport alumni
Association football midfielders
Association football defenders
Australia youth international soccer players